is a passenger railway station located in the city of Chichibu, Saitama, Japan, operated by the private railway operator Chichibu Railway.

Lines
It is also served by through services to and from the Seibu Chichibu Line.

Station layout
The station is staffed and consists of a single island platforms serving two bidirectional tracks. Storage tracks alongside platform 1 are used to stable rolling stock and also for freight trains arriving and departing on the private spur line to the Chichibu Taiheiyo Cement Corporation Minowa Mine approximately 1 km south of the station.

Platforms

Adjacent stations

History
Kagemori Station opened on 27 September 1917.

Passenger statistics
In fiscal 2018, the station was used by an average of 494 passengers daily.

Surrounding area
 Arakawa River
 
 Chichibu Kagemori Junior High School
 Chichibu Taiheiyo Cement Corporation Minowa Mine

References

External links

 Kagemori Station information (Saitama Prefectural Government) 
 Kagemori Station timetable 

Railway stations in Japan opened in 1917
Railway stations in Saitama Prefecture
Chichibu, Saitama